Greg Neeld (born February 25, 1955, in Vancouver, British Columbia) is a retired ice hockey defenceman. He played 17 games for the Toronto Toros of the World Hockey Association.

On December 7, 1973, in an Ontario Hockey Association junior game between Neeld's Toronto Marlboros and the Kitchener Rangers, Neeld was high-sticked in the face by Kitchener's Dave Maloney, resulting in the loss of his left eye. Neeld became the first player (excluding goaltenders) to wear a facial shield in regular play. Neeld's injury brought attention to issue of ocular safety in ice hockey, and in Canada, facial protection was made mandatory for minor hockey by 1980. Today, many leagues across North America and Europe mandate use of visors for their players.

He persevered with his dream to become a professional hockey player. He was drafted 71st overall in the fourth round of the 1975 NHL Amateur Draft by the Buffalo Sabres and 40th overall in the third round of the 1975 WHA Amateur Draft by the Minnesota Fighting Saints. He never played an NHL game, as the Sabres were not able to get around the rule that a player was required to be sighted in both eyes. However, Neeld appeared in 17 games with the Toronto Toros in the 1975-76 WHA season, registering only one assist. He spent part of the season in the NAHL, and the entirety of the next season. He played two more seasons in the International Hockey League (IHL) for four various teams until 1979.

Neeld is currently the CEO of a Vancouver-based mining exploration company.

References

External links

1955 births
Living people
Buffalo Norsemen players
Buffalo Sabres draft picks
Calgary Centennials players
Canadian ice hockey defencemen
Erie Blades players
Grand Rapids Owls players
Kalamazoo Wings (1974–2000) players
Minnesota Fighting Saints draft picks
Muskegon Mohawks players
Ice hockey people from Vancouver
Sportspeople with a vision impairment
Sudbury Wolves players
Toledo Goaldiggers players
Toronto Marlboros players
Toronto Toros players